State of Euphoria is the fourth studio album by the American heavy metal band Anthrax. It was released on September 19, 1988, through Megaforce/Island Records.

Album information
State of Euphoria was produced by Anthrax and Mark Dodson, with Alex Perialas engineering. Guitarist Scott Ian has been quoted as saying that the band hired Dodson to produce this album because of his work with Judas Priest and Metal Church. The album reached No. 30 on the Billboard 200 chart in late 1988 and was certified Gold by the RIAA on February 8, 1989. The songs "Who Cares Wins", dealing with the plight of the homeless, and "Antisocial" (a cover of the song by the French band Trust) were released as singles with accompanying music videos.

The song "Misery Loves Company" is based on the Stephen King novel Misery, while "Now It's Dark" was inspired by the David Lynch film Blue Velvet, specifically the behavior of the sexually depraved, self-asphyxiating, murderous sociopath Frank Booth, as played by Dennis Hopper. The song "Make Me Laugh" is critical of Jim and Tammy Fae Bakker and televangelism in general, a popular target of thrash metal bands of that period. The song specifically mentioned minutiae such as the air-conditioned doghouse and Christian amusement park. The majority of the album's music was composed by drummer Charlie Benante while lyrics were composed by rhythm guitarist Scott Ian.

The back cover of the album contains a parody picture of the band drawn by Mort Drucker, a caricaturist best known for his artwork in the magazine Mad.

Reception

Critical reception for the album was lukewarm upon its release. The album failed to live up to the expectations, commercial and otherwise, set by the band's previous releases, Spreading the Disease, Among the Living and the I'm the Man EP.

Aside from "Be All, End All" and "Antisocial", most of the songs on State of Euphoria have not appeared on the band's live setlists since the album's accompanying tour in 1988–1989. The only songs from this album that have never been played live at least once are "Schism", "Misery Loves Company" and "13". The members of Anthrax have since spoken about their mixed opinions on State of Euphoria, and drummer Charlie Benante has been quoted as saying that the band feels the album was not finished properly.

Touring and promotion
Anthrax spent nearly a year touring in support of State of Euphoria. Prior to the album's release, the band supported Iron Maiden on their Seventh Tour of a Seventh Tour in Europe, and opened for Ozzy Osbourne on his No Rest for the Wicked tour in the United States from November 1988 to January 1989. The band also opened for Metallica on their Damaged Justice tour.

Anthrax continued touring in 1989, playing six shows in the UK with Living Colour in March, and headlining the Headbangers Ball Tour (with support from Helloween and Exodus) in April–May. Following the Headbangers Ball tour, Anthrax toured Europe with Suicidal Tendencies, King's X and M.O.D., which took place in June–July 1989.

Track listing

Personnel
Band members
 Joey Belladonna – lead vocals
 Dan Spitz – lead guitar, backing vocals
 Scott Ian – rhythm guitar, backing vocals
 Frank Bello – bass, backing vocals
 Charlie Benante – drums

Additional musicians
 Carol Freedman – cello

Production
 Anthrax and Mark Dodson – production
 Alex Perialas – engineering, associate production
 Bridget Daly,  Paul Speck – assistant engineering
 Jon Zazula and Marsha Zazula – executive production
 Don Brautigam, Mort Drucker – artwork
 Gene Ambo – photography

Charts

Certifications

References

External links

Anthrax (American band) albums
Megaforce Records albums
1988 albums
Albums produced by Mark Dodson
Island Records albums
Albums produced by Alex Perialas